A national day of mourning is a day or days marked by mourning and memorial activities observed among the majority of a country's populace. They are designated by the national government. Such days include those marking the death or funeral of a renowned individual or individuals from that country or elsewhere or the anniversary of such a death or deaths, the anniversaries of a significant natural or man-made disaster occurring either in the country or another country, wartime commemorations or in memory of the victims of a terrorist attack. Flying a national or military flag of that country at half-mast is a common symbol.

List
The following are lists for national days of mourning across the world:
 Before 2000
 2000–2019
 2020–present

Selected list of figures recognized

State officials 
 A National Day of Mourning is typically declared for Presidents of the United States, usually on the day of their funerals. Beginning with John F. Kennedy, these days are also considered federal holidays. There was no official day of mourning for Herbert Hoover.
 In the Soviet Union, an official mourning period was reserved for the deaths of leaders or former leaders, with Alexei Rykov, Nikita Khrushchev and Georgy Malenkov being notable exceptions after Rykov was executed during the Great Purge and the other two were relegated to obscurity. Khrushchev's death was announced only hours before he was buried without full state honors, while Malenkov's death was publicly announced more than 2 weeks after he died. This custom changed in 1968 when a national day of mourning was declared for Soviet cosmonaut Yuri Gagarin, the first human to journey into outer space. In the final years of the Soviet Union, official mourning was declared for 2 disasters: the 1988 Armenian earthquake and the Ufa train disaster.
 Presidents of Mexico, usually on the day of their funerals. These days are usually considered municipal and religious holidays in Mexico City and federal holidays in the rest of the republic. Miguel de la Madrid in 2012 was the most recent.

International days of mourning 
A similar but rarely-used concept exists at the European Union-level and is called a European Day of Mourning. The European Commission first introduced the concept on 12 September 2001, when a day of mourning was declared across EU member states for the victims of the terrorist attacks in the United States. A second day of mourning was held in November 2015 for the victims of the Paris attacks.

Remembrance events 
While not the same as a national day of mourning, some remembrance events and protests are called a "day of mourning".
 National Day of Mourning (Bangladesh), held 15 August. In 1975 the first president of independent Bangladesh and the "father of the nation" who is also called "Bangabandhu," Sheikh Mujibur Rahman was killed by a group of army personnel, along with his family.
 Circassian Day of Mourning, held May 21, commemorating the Circassian genocide and the Circassian defeat in the Russian-Circassian War 
 Day of Mourning (Australia), annual protest of Aboriginal and Torres Strait Islander Australians held on Australia Day, 26 January
 National Day of Mourning (United States protest), an American Indian protest held on the fourth Thursday of November
 National Day of Mourning (Canadian observance), held 28 April, a commemoration of workers killed or injured on the job
 Nakba Day, annual commemoration of the 1948 Palestinian exodus on 15 May by Palestinians worldwide.

See also 
 European Day of Mourning

References 

Death customs
National days
Observances honoring the dead